The Powers of Trustees, Mortgagees, etc. Act 1860 (23 & 24 Vict c 145), sometimes referred to as the Lord Cranworth's Act 1860, was an Act of the Parliament of the United Kingdom.

The Act sought to formalise and regularise various provisions commonly included by chancery lawyers of the day in mortgages, wills and other settlements.

It is the first statute in English law to refer to receivers.  It was sponsored by the Lord Chancellor, Lord Cranworth.  Section 11 of the Act implied a term into each mortgage instrument for the appointment of a receiver or the exercise of a power of sale as an alternative to foreclosure.

Most of its provisions were repealed by the Conveyancing Act 1881. Parts I and IV (being so much of the Act as was not repealed by the Conveyancing and Law of Property Act 1881) were repealed by section 64(1) of, and the Schedule to, the Settled Land Act 1882 (45 & 46 Vict c 38), with savings in section 64(2).

References
Halsbury's Statutes,
Langley, Albert Gordon. A Reading of the Act 23 & 24 Vict cap 145. London. 1861. See catalogues such as Horace Cox and Faculty of Advocates. Reviewed at (1862) 37 The Law Times 332. Serialised at (1861) 36 The Law Times 2, 28, 68, 80, 103, 115, 186, 318, 332, 344, 402, 427, 438, 501, 523, 583, 593.
"Art VIII - Lord Cranworth's Trustees and Mortgagees Act" (1860) 10 Law Magazine and Law Review 118
"The Trustees and Mortgagees Act (23 & 24 Vic c 145)" (1861) 1 Law Students' Examination Chronicle 70
Carson and Bompas. "Trustees and Mortgagees Act". Shelford's Real Property Statutes. Ninth Edition. Sweet and Maxwell. Stevens and Sons. London. 1893. Pages 558 to 565. Carson. Eighth Edition. 1874. Pages 731 to 741. Shelford, Leonard. The Real Property Statutes. Seventh Edition. 1863. Pages 699 to 708.
Paterson, William (ed). "Trustees, Mortgagees, &c Act". The Practical Statutes of the Session 1860. John Crockford. London. 1860. Pages 377 to 387.

United Kingdom Acts of Parliament 1860